Gérard Le Cam (born 24 February 1954, in Côtes-d'Armor) was a member of the Senate of France, who represented the Côtes-d'Armor department.  He is a member of the Communist, Republican, and Citizen Group.

External links
Page on the Senate website 

1954 births
Living people
French Senators of the Fifth Republic
People from Côtes-d'Armor
Senators of Côtes-d'Armor